Regina Inez Hinojosa (born December 8, 1973) is an American lawyer and politician. She is a Democratic member of the Texas House of Representatives, representing the 49th District. Hinojosa was sworn into the Texas House on January 10, 2017, after winning the November 2016 general election. She succeeded Democrat Elliott Naishtat, who did not run for re-election.

Prior to becoming a state legislator, Hinojosa worked for the American Federation of State, County and Municipal Employees and for the law firm of Kator, Parks & Weiser. In 2005, she was part of the legal team that sued U.S. House Majority Leader Tom DeLay. She was also a member of the Austin Independent School District's school board and has worked part-time for Catholic Charities USA, Texas Rural Legal Aid, and the Equal Justice Center.

Election History

2016

2018

2020

2022

2016 General Election

References

External links
 State legislative page
 Gina Hinojosa at the Texas Tribune

Living people
Democratic Party members of the Texas House of Representatives
21st-century American politicians
University of Texas at Austin alumni
Hispanic and Latino American state legislators in Texas
Hispanic and Latino American women in politics
George Washington University Law School alumni
Women state legislators in Texas
21st-century American women politicians
American Federation of State, County and Municipal Employees people
1973 births